Rigabad (also Romanized as Rīgābād; also known as Rekāvā, Rīkābād, and Rikiowa) is a village in Lahijan Rural District, in the Central District of Piranshahr County, West Azerbaijan Province, Iran. At the 2006 census, its population was 516, in 82 families.

References 

Populated places in Piranshahr County